Leo Mohn (June 6, 1925 – July 9, 1980) was an American farmer, cattle breeder, and electric company foreman.

Born in Woodville, Wisconsin, Mohn was a farmer, electric company foreman, and was involved with the breeders and creamery cooperatives. He served on the Woodville School Board and was involved with the Democratic Party. Mohn served in the Wisconsin State Assembly from 1971 to 1979. He died in a hospital in Hayward, Wisconsin after suffering a heart attack while on vacation. He was seeking election at the time of his death after taking out nomination papers.

Notes

1925 births
1980 deaths
People from St. Croix County, Wisconsin
Farmers from Wisconsin
School board members in Wisconsin
20th-century American businesspeople
20th-century American politicians
Democratic Party members of the Wisconsin State Assembly